Larock is a surname. Notable people with the surname include:

Victor Larock (1904–1977), Belgian socialist politician
Yves Larock (born 1977), Swiss DJ and producer

See also
Laroque (disambiguation)
Larroque (disambiguation)